The Kazoo Funk Orchestra are a music collective from Glasgow, Scotland.

Biography
The Kazoo Funk Orchestra formed in Scotland at the end of 2005, as a pre-apocalyptic merry-go-round collective, featuring musicians, anti-poets, dancers and finger painters. Building their melodies at a DIY project studio in producer Ray McCartney’s living room, the band exchanged influences and took inspiration from various genres to create their eclectic mix-tape sound.
 
In May 2006, the band released their 25-track debut album, Midnight Finger Painter, in which the first 500 copies included a unique finger painting created by fans and band members. This was followed by a handful of local gigs, before Adventures in Fuzzy Felt Land was released as a thirteen track EP in January 2007. 

In the summer of 2007, the collective undertook their first UK tour, including a couple of festival dates. The latter included a  closing slot at the 2008 Wickerman Festival. 

During the winter of 2007-2008, the band released This Album is Self Titled, their second LP. 

A recorded session was aired on BBC Alba in January 2009.

Achievements
 Received radio airplay on XFM Scotland and BBC Radio.
 Nominated for an Indy Award in 2008.
 Interviewed on Greek TV show, Art Uber Alles.
 Featured on King Tut's Wah Wah Hut's YourSound compilation album, Best of Term One.

Discography
Midnight Finger Painter (2006)
Santa's Dead (2006)
Adventures in Fuzzy Felt Land (2007)
This Album is Self Titled (2008)
Motion Sickness (2008)
Defunked (2011)

Members

Current members
 Big Beard
 Boyce
 Mr Bruff
 Part-Time Dav
 Glowstick Girl

Past members
 Little Beard
 Country Bumkin
 Mia Funkyslice
 Loop de Loop
 Herbal
 Mechanical
 Smalls
 El Baterista
 Blunder
 Grum
 Krash Slaughta (II Tone Committee, All Time High, Monkey Mafia)
 Jim 'N' Tonic
 T-Bone (aka Nunny Boy of All Time High)
 Lozzi Kazoo

References

External links
 The Kazoo Funk Orchestra Official website
 The Kazoo Funk Orchestra MySpace Profile
 BBC Rapal Live session on BBC Rapal
 Live Review from Wickerman Festival 2007
 Album Review (Midnight Finger Painter) in the Daily Record
 Trailer Trash CREME Skateboards promo video featuring The Kazoo Funk Orchestra

Scottish rock music groups